Raduša is a mountain in the Dinaric Alps of Bosnia and Herzegovina, located near Gornji Vakuf, spanning the area between Vukovsko polje in the north, the Stožer mountain in the east, the Rama basin in the south, the Makljen mountain pass in the west, near the source of the Vrbas.

References

External links
 Raduša at SummitPost.org

Mountains of Bosnia and Herzegovina